Woodend is a  rural community in the central part of the Riverina about 14 kilometres north east of Pleasant Hills.  It is situated by road, about 12 kilometres west from Yerong Creek and 23 kilometres east from Osborne.

Notes and references

Towns in the Riverina
Towns in New South Wales
Lockhart Shire